The 2006–07 Essex Senior Football League season was the 36th in the history of Essex Senior Football League, a football competition in England.

League table

The league featured 13 clubs which competed in the league last season, along with three new clubs:
Barking, new club formed after Barking & East Ham United folded
Beaumont Athletic, joined from the Essex Business League
Clapton, joined from the Isthmian League

League table

References

Essex Senior Football League seasons
9